was a Japanese football player and manager. He played for Japan national team. He also managed Japan national team.

Club career
Ishii was born in Fukuyama on March 13, 1939. After graduating from high school, he joined his local club Toyo Industries in 1957. In 1965, Toyo Industries joined new league Japan Soccer League. The club won the league champions for 3 years in a row (1965-1967) and Emperor's Cup 2 times (1965 and 1967 Emperor's Cup). He played 28 games in the league. In 1968, he moved to new club Towa Real Estate (later Fujita Industries). The club was promoted to Japan Soccer League in 1972. He retired in 1975.

National team career
On August 15, 1962, Ishii debuted for Japan national team against Singapore.

Coaching career
In 1975, when Ishii played for Fujita Industries, he became a playing manager as Yukio Shimomura successor. The club won the champions in 1977 and 1979. The club also won 1979 Emperor's Cup. He left the club in 1980. In 1986, he named a manager for Japan national team as Takaji Mori successor. He managed at 1986 Asian Games. However, at 1988 Summer Olympics qualification in October 1987, following Japan's failure to qualify for 1988 Summer Olympics, he resigned as manager. In 1988, he returned to Fujita Industries and managed the club. However, in 1989–90 season, the club was relegated to Division 2 and he resigned as manager.

Ishii died on April 26, 2018 at the age of 79.

Club statistics

National team statistics

References

External links
 
 Japan National Football Team Database

1939 births
2018 deaths
Association football people from Hiroshima Prefecture
Japanese footballers
Japan international footballers
Japan Soccer League players
Sanfrecce Hiroshima players
Shonan Bellmare players
Japanese football managers
Japan national football team managers
Association football midfielders